Two human polls comprised the 1990 National Collegiate Athletic Association (NCAA) Division I-A football rankings. Unlike most sports, college football's governing body, the NCAA, does not bestow a national championship, instead that title is bestowed by one or more different polling agencies. There are two main weekly polls that begin in the preseason—the AP Poll and the Coaches Poll.

Legend

AP Poll

Coaches Poll
The Coaches Poll expanded to 25 teams in 1990, joining the AP poll which had done so in 1989. Florida, Houston, and Oklahoma were on probation by the NCAA during the 1990 season; they were therefore ineligible to receive votes in the Coaches Poll.

References

NCAA Division I FBS football rankings